Stephen Sanford (May 26, 1826 – February 13, 1913) was an American businessman and a member of the United States House of Representatives from New York's 18th congressional district.

Life and career
Born in Mayfield, New York, he was the son of Mary (née Slack) and her husband John Sanford (1803–1857). He attended the common schools and local academy at Amsterdam, New York, Georgetown College, Washington, D.C., for two years, and the United States Military Academy at West Point, New York. He joined his father's carpet manufacturing business in 1844 but in 1854, the mill burned to the ground. His father retired but Stephen Sanford rebuilt the business to the point where it was employing twenty-five hundred workers.

In 1849, Stephen Sanford married Sarah Jane Cochrane (1830–1901) and had five children. Eldest child John Sanford II (1851–1939) would take over the family business.

Sanford was elected as Republican to the Forty-first Congress (March 4, 1869 - March 4, 1871). He declined to be a candidate for renomination. In 1876, he served as a delegate to the Republican National Convention.

He died in Amsterdam, New York in 1913 and was interred in the family plot in the Green Hill Cemetery.

Thoroughbred horse racing

Stephen Sanford operated Hurricana Stock Farm near the town of Amsterdam, New York where he bred and trained thoroughbred racehorses. He named many his top American horses after members of the Mohawk nation. In 1880 his horses began racing at nearby Saratoga Race Course. His grandson, also named Stephen, owned Sergeant Murphy, the 1923 winner of England's Grand National steeplechase. His son John would continue on very successfully in racing and the Sanford Stakes was created in their honor in 1913, the year of Stephen Sanford's death.

References

 Schenectady Digital History Archive — a service of the Schenectady County Public Library

1826 births
1913 deaths
American polo players
American racehorse owners and breeders
Stephen
United States Military Academy alumni
Republican Party members of the United States House of Representatives from New York (state)
19th-century American politicians
19th-century American businesspeople
Georgetown College (Georgetown University) alumni